The Ottawa Harlequins were a Canadian rugby union team based in eastern Ontario. The team played in the Rugby Canada Super League and drew most of its players from the Eastern Ontario Rugby Union, one of fourteen Rugby Unions that have rep teams in the RCSL.

They played their home games at Twin Elm Rugby Park in South Nepean, Ottawa.

External links
 

Rugby union teams in Ontario
Sports teams in Ottawa